The Laussedat Heights are a series of elevations extending eastward for  in the southwest part of Arctowski Peninsula, on the west coast of Graham Land, Antarctica. They were mapped by the Falkland Islands Dependencies Survey from photos taken by Hunting Aerosurveys Ltd in 1956–57, and were named by the UK Antarctic Place-Names Committee in 1960 for Aimé Laussedat (1819–1907), a French military engineer, and the "father of photogrammetry," who pioneered the application of photography to survey from about 1851 onward.

References

Mountains of Graham Land
Danco Coast